The Olt (Romanian and Hungarian; ;  or , ,  Alytos) is a river in Romania. It is the longest river flowing exclusively through Romania. Its source is in the Hășmaș Mountains of the eastern Carpathian Mountains, near Bălan, rising close to the headwaters of the river Mureș. It flows through the Romanian counties Harghita, Covasna, Brașov, Sibiu, Vâlcea, and Olt. The river was known as Alutus or Aluta in Roman antiquity. Olt County and the historical province of Oltenia are named after the river.

Sfântu Gheorghe, Râmnicu Vâlcea and Slatina are the main cities  on the river Olt. The Olt flows into the Danube river near Turnu Măgurele.

Settlements

The main cities along the river Olt are Miercurea Ciuc, Sfântu Gheorghe, Făgăraș, Râmnicu Vâlcea and Slatina.

The Olt passes through the following communes, from source to mouth: Bălan, Sândominic, Tomești, Cârța, Dănești, Mădăraș, Racu, Siculeni, Ciceu, Miercurea Ciuc, Sâncrăieni, Sântimbru, Sânsimion, Tușnad, Băile Tușnad, Bixad, Micfalău, Malnaș, Bodoc, Ghidfalău, Sfântu Gheorghe, Ilieni, Prejmer, Hărman, Vâlcele, Bod, Feldioara, Hăghig, Măieruș, Belin, Apața, Aita Mare, Ormeniș, Baraolt, Augustin, Racoș, Hoghiz, Ungra, Comăna, Părău, Șercaia, Mândra, Făgăraș, Beclean, Voila, Viștea, Ucea, Arpașu de Jos, Cârța, Porumbacu de Jos, Avrig, Racovița, Tălmaciu, Turnu Roșu, Boița, Câineni, Racovița, Brezoi, Călimănești, Dăești, Bujoreni, Râmnicu Vâlcea, Budești, Mihăești, Galicea, Băbeni, Ionești, Olanu, Drăgoești, Orlești, Dobroteasa, Prundeni, Vulturești, Verguleasa, Drăgășani, Voicești, Teslui, Grădinari, Strejești, Curtișoara, Pleșoiu, Găneasa, Olt, Slatina, Slătioara, Milcov, Piatra-Olt, Brâncoveni, Ipotești, Osica de Sus, Coteana, Fălcoiu, Mărunței, Drăgănești-Olt, Fărcașele, Stoenești, Dăneasa, Gostavățu, Sprâncenata, Băbiciu, Scărișoara, Rusănești, Cilieni, Tia Mare, Izbiceni, Lunca, Giuvărăști and Islaz.

Tributaries
The following rivers are tributaries of the river Olt (from source to mouth):

Left: Mediaș, Fântâna lui Gal, Sedloco, Babașa, Șoarecu, Cad, Racul, Nicolești, Delnița, Pustnic, Fitod, Fișag, Tușnad, Vârghiș, Valea Roșie, Micfalău, Pârâul Urșilor, Malnaș, Hereț, Talomir, Râul Negru, Valea Neagră, Ghimbășel, Bârsa, Homorod (Ciucaș), Crizbav, Valea Cetății (Rotbav), Valea Seacă, Hotaru, Măieruș, Bozom, Valea Lungă, Remetea, Ormeniș, Top, Valea Cetății (Racoș), Valea Mare, Bogata, Lupșa, Comana, Veneția, Părău, Găvan, Șercaia, Urăsa, Mândra, Iaz, Sebeș, Racovița, Hurez, Săvăstreni, Netot, Dridif, Breaza, Sâmbăta, Racovița, Drăguș, Hotarul, Viștea, Corbul Viștei, Corbul Ucei, Ucea, Racovița, Gârlățel, Gostaia, Arpaș, Valea Neagră, Cârțișoara, Opat, Scorei, Sărata, Porumbacu, Avrig, Mârșa, Racovița, Sebeș, Strâmba, Rândibou, Curpăn, Valea Satului, Boia Mare, Pârâul Sec, Băiaș, Lotrișor, Văratica, Păușa, Valea Satului, Sălătrucel, Alunoasa, Valea Satului, Sâmnic, Aninoasa, Pârâul Ruzii, Topolog, Ursana, Stăneasa, Geamăna, Cungra, Sterpul, Cepturaru, Surduiu, Cungrișoara, Recea, Racovăț, Teslui, Strehareți, Milcov, Cinculeasa, Oboga, Dârjov, Iminog
Right: Sipoș, Lunca Mare, Lunca, Modicea, Mădărașul Mare, Șopot, Var, Segheș, Știuca, Beta, Capolnaș, Techera, Valea Mare, Chendreș, Valea Merilor, Chereș, Pârâul Mare, Mitaci, Răchitiș, Calnic, Valea Crișului, Arcuș, Valea Porumbelor, Debren, Valea Sâmbrezii, Ilieni, Baciu, Vâlcele, Hăghig, Iarăș, Corlat, Belinul Mare, Valea Adânca, Aita, Valea Mateiașului, Pârâul Adânc, Căpeni (Chepeț), Baraolt, Cormoș, Pârâul Sărat, Homorod, Dăișoara, Crăița, Ticuș, Felmer, Galați, Poenița, Cincu, Golbav, Pârâul Nou, Valea Fermelor, Brad, Cibin, Pleașa, Megieș, Lotrioara, Vad, Valea Largă, Valea lui Vlad, Uria, Robești, Sărăcinești, Călinești, Lotru, Lotrișor, Căciulata, Valea Căldărilor, Muereasca, Bujoreanca, Olănești, Pârâul Sărat, Govora, Focșa, Bistrița, Luncavăț, Nisipoasa, Pesceana, Oporelu Canal, Oltișor, Olteț, Teslui, Caracal, Vlădila, Suhat, Crușov

Dams

For supply of drinking water and water for irrigation and for the production of hydroelectricity, 44 reservoirs have been built in the Olt river basin. There are 24 reservoirs for hydropower on the river Olt itself, and three on its tributary Lotru. There are hydropower plants at (from source to mouth) Voila, Viștea, Arpaș, Scoreiu, Avrig, Gura Lotrului, Turnu, Călimănești, Dăești, Râmnicu Vâlcea, Râureni, Govora, Băbeni, Ionești, Zăvideni, Drăgășani, Strejești, Arcești, Slatina, Ipotești, Drăgănești, Frunzaru, Rusănești and Izbiceni. The total energy production of the 43 hydropower plants in the Olt basin was 2,980 GWh in 1996.

Gallery

 More pictures: Raft ride (rafting) on Olt

See also
Olt Defile
Limes Alutanus

References

Rivers of Romania
 
Rivers of Harghita County
Rivers of Covasna County
Rivers of Brașov County
Rivers of Sibiu County
Rivers of Vâlcea County
Rivers of Olt County
Rivers of Teleorman County